Queen Gongye of the Jangheung Im clan (2 October 1109 – 2 December 1183) was a Korean queen consort as the 3rd wife of King Injong of Goryeo. As his favourite and beloved wife, she was the mother of his three successors (Uijong, Myeongjong, Sinjong) and most of his children.

Biography

Early life
The future Queen Gongye was born into the Jangheung Im clan on 7 September 1109 in Dangdong village, Okdang-ri, Gwansan-eup, Jangheung-gun, Jeollanam-do as the eldest child and daughter of Im Won-hu. Her mother was from the Bupyeong Yi clan.

As the oldest, she had a younger sister who would eventually become the mother of the future Queen Jangseon, so Lady Choi was both the Queen's maternal niece and later daughter-in-law.

Youth life
When she was 15 years old in 1123, she promised to married with Kim In-gyu (김인규)'s son, Kim Ji-hyo (김지효) from the Gyeongju Kim clan. However, when Kim arrived in her house, she suddenly fell ill and was on the verge of death. Knowing this, her father, Im Won-hu, canceled the marriage between two and instead go to a fortune teller. That fortune teller then said that a girl was destined to become a queen.

Eventually, this rumor was heard into Yi Ja-gyeom, the Goryeo's leader at this time. Feared if Im Won-hu's daughter becoming the new queen that meant Yi's powerful clan will downfall, so Yi arranged the marriage of his 3rd and 4th daughter to married and become King Injong's queen consorts. Im Won-hu then honoured as Gaeseong Ambassador. Later, in 1126, when Yi Ja-gyeom's rebellion turned into failure and his two daughters were got its impact with expelled from their throne and left the palace, also their "noble" families got collapsed.

Marriage and Palace life
In the same year too, there were held the Queen's selection and Lady Im was the chosen one and entered the palace not long after that. She and Injong then formally married on 20 June 1206 at her 18 years old and became the new Queen Consort of Goryeo. One year later, on 11 April 1127, she gave birth into their eldest son, Prince Wang Hyeon. Later, on 10 May 1129, Injong gave her Singyeong Mansion (선경부, 善慶府) in  Hudeok Hall (후덕전, 厚德殿), one of the royal hall in "Yeondeok Palace" (연덕궁, 延德宮) as her palace, making her honoured as Princess Yeondeok (연덕궁주, 延德宮主).

In the next year, she gave birth into their second, third, fourth son (Prince Wang Gyeong, Prince Wang Ho, also Prince Chung-hui). In 1144, she bore Injong a son again, Prince Wang Tak. Beside five sons, they also had 4 daughters. It was said that Injong loves her so much and elevated her birthplace from "Jangheung-bu" (장흥부, 長興府) to "Jijangheung-busa" (지장흥부사, 知長興府事). Her mother, Lady Yi was formally called as "Grand Lady of the Jinhan State" (진한국대부인(辰韓國大夫人).

Children's succession to the throne
After Injong's death on 10 April 1146, their eldest son, Wang Hyeon, ascended the throne as King Uijong, she then became the queen mother and lived in Hudeok Hall (후덕전, 厚德殿). Uijong also built the Seongyeong Mansion (선경부, 善慶府). However, Uijong was said to be often drunk, further angering the warriors. Knowing that her eldest son like that, the Queen Mother was skeptical of his qualifications, choose to favored her 2nd son, Marquess Daeryeong and wanted to  replaced Uijong with him. Since this, she and Uijong had a bad relationship and those made her 2nd son got rebellion incident that occurred in 1151.

For protected her beloved son, the Queen Mother persuaded Uijong to safe his younger brother, but Uijong expressed his disappointment from the past. Then, he go out from the palace on her socks and looked up to the sky, swearing an oath to plead her injustice. Suddenly, thunder and lightning struck from heaven and it was said that Uijong repented of his mistake. But in the autumn 1170, after constant discriminations, the rage of the military officials burst and started a military revolt, murdering the civil officials, deposing Uijong, and appointing a new king in his place (Wang Ho as King Myeongjong).

Although she intended that their second son should succeed in the throne, he was assassinated because Jeong Jung-bu (정중부) feared that he might become a threat to him in the future. Jeong then choose the weak Wang Ho, due to the true rulers were the military leaders at this time. During Myeongjong's reign, the Queen Mother was ill and the King then called his younger brother, Chunghui to take care of her. However, as the beloved one, Chunghui then died in 1182, she then thought herself that she had been angry by the gods, those made Chunghui had been killed, so she couldn't withstand the shock and became ill for some days.

Later life, death, and funeral
When Duke Pyeongnyang was suffered from hemorrhoids and couldn't greet his mother for a long time, she thought again that this son had suffered the same anger as his older brother, Chunghui. One year later, Wang Tak finally healed from his illness and go to greeted and comforted her by Myeongjong's order. Exactly on 2 December 1183, the Queen Mother died in her 74 years old due to her hard illness and then received her Posthumous name and was buried in Sulleung Tomb (순릉, 純陵).

Then, in 1184, the Jin Dynasty under Emperor Shizong, pay some tributes to Goryeo for express their condolences.

Family 
 Uncle - Im Won-suk (임원숙, 任元淑)
 Father - Im Won-hu (임원후, 任元厚) (1089 - 1156)
 Uncle - Im Won-jun (임원준, 任元濬)
 Grandfather - Im Ui (임의, 任懿) (1041 - 1117)
 Grandmother - Princess Consort Nakrang of the Yi clan (낙랑군부인 이씨, 樂浪郡夫人 李氏)
 Mother - Grand Lady Jinhan of the Yi clan (진한국대부인 이씨, 韓國大夫人 李氏) (? - 1138)
 Grandfather - Yi Wi (이위, 李瑋)
 Siblings
 Younger sister - Lady Im of the Jangheung Im clan (장흥 임씨)
 Younger brother - Im Geuk-chong (임극충, 任克忠)
 Younger brother - Im Geuk-jeong (임극정, 任克正)
 Younger brother - Im Bu (임부, 任溥)
 Younger brother - Im Yu (임유, 任濡) (1149 - 1212)
 Nephew - Im Gyeong-suk (임경숙, 任景肅)
 Nephew - Im Gyeong-gyeom (임경겸, 任景謙)
 Nephew - Im Hyo-sun (임효순, 任孝順) 
 Nephew - Im Gyeong-sun (임경순, 任景恂)
 Younger brother - Im Hang (임항, 任沆) (? - November 1191)
 Husband - Wang Hae, Injong of Goryeo (고려 인종) (29 October 1109 - 10 April 1146)
 Father-in-law - Wang Woo, Yejong of Goryeo (고려 예종) (11 February 1079 - 15 May 1122)
 Mother-in-law - Queen Sundeok of the Incheon Lee clan (순덕왕후 이씨) (15 April 1094 - 21 September 1118)
 Issue
 Son - Wang Hyeon, Uijong of Goryeo (고려 의종) (23 May 1127 - 7 July 1173)
 Daughter-in-law - Queen Janggyeong of the Gangneung Kim clan (장경왕후 김씨)
 Daughter-in-law - Queen Jangseon of the Choi clan (장선왕후 최씨)
 Daughter - Princess Seunggyeong (승경궁주) (? - 1158)
 Son-in-law - Wang Yeong, Marquess Gonghwa (공화후 왕영) (1126 - 1186)
 Granddaughter - Lady Wang of the Kaeseong Wang clan (개성 왕씨) (1150 - 1185) 
 Grandson - Wang Myeon, Duke Gwangreung (광릉공 왕면) (? - 1218)
 Granddaughter-in-law - Princess Hwasun (화순궁주)
 Son - Wang Gyeong, Marquess Daeryeong (대령후) (1130 - 1167?)
 Daughter-in-law - Lady Wang of the Kaeseong Wang clan (개성 왕씨)
 Son - Wang Ho, Myeongjong of Goryeo (고려 명종) (8 November 1131 - 3 December 1202)
 Daughter-in-law - Queen Uijeong of the Gangneung Kim clan (의정왕후 김씨) (? - 1170?)
 Son - Wang Chung-hui (왕충희) or Wongyeongguksa (원경국사) (? - 1183)
 Daughter - Princess Deoknyeong (덕녕궁주) (? - 1192)
 Son-in-law - Wang Gam, Duke Gangyang (강양공 왕감)
 Granddaughter - Crown Princess Wang (태자비 왕씨)
 Grandson-in-law - Crown Prince Hyoryeong (효령태자) (4 June 1149 - ?)
 Great-Grandson (태손) (? - 1170)
 Daughter - Princess Changrak (창락궁주) (? - 1216)
 Son-in-law - Wang Seong, Marquess Sinan (신안후 왕성) (? - 1178)
 Grandson - Wang Won, Marquekk Gyeseong (계성후 왕원)
 Grandson - Wang Jin, Marquess Yeongin (영인후 왕진) (? - 1220)
 Granddaughter - Queen Wondeok of the Yu clan (원덕왕후 유씨) (? - 1239)
 Daughter - Princess Yeonghwa (영화궁주) (1141 - 1208)
 Son-in-law - Wang Gong, Marquess Soseong (소성후 왕공) 
 Grandson - Wang Woo, Marquess Changgwa (창화후 왕우)
 Grandson - Wang Seon (왕선) (? - 1216)
 Granddaughter - Lady Wang of the Kaeseong Wang clan (개성 왕씨)
 Grandson-in-law - Yi Gan (이간, 李侃)
 Son - Wang Tak, Sinjong of Goryeo (고려 신종) (11 November 1144 - 15 February 1204)
 Daughter-in-law - Queen Seonjeong of the Gangneung Kim clan (선정왕후 김씨) (? - 1222)

In popular culture
Portrayed by Kim Yoon-kyung in the 2003–2004 KBS TV Series Age of Warriors.

References

External links
Queen Gongye on Encykorea .
공예태후 on Doosan Encyclopedia .

1109 births
1183 deaths
Korean queens consort
12th-century Korean women
Royal consorts of the Goryeo Dynasty
Jangheung Im clan
12th-century Korean people
People from South Jeolla Province